Anica Bošković (born 1714 in Republic of Ragusa – died 13 August 1804 in Ragusa) was a Ragusan writer. She wrote a pastoral song and translated from the Italian language. Christian themes permeate her work. Hers was one of the first important women's names in Ragusan literature. 

Her work, The Dialogue (1758), was the first and sole literary work written by a female author in the literature of Ragusa.

She was born in
Dubrovnik, Republic of Ragusa -- to Nikola Bošković, a Ragusan merchant,
originally from Orahov Do near Ravno (at the time part of the Ottoman Empire, now Bosnia and Herzegovina), and Paola Bettera (1674–1777), scion of a wealthy family -- on either November 3 or December 3, 1714, the youngest of nine children. One of her brothers, Roger Joseph Boscovich, was a notable physicist, astronomer, mathematician, philosopher, diplomat, poet, theologian, Jesuit priest, and a polymath, and two other brothers, the Latinist Baro Bošković and the poet Petar Bošković, contributed to Ragusan culture. Her contemporaries included Lukrecija Bogašinović and Dositej Obradović.

References

Sources
Ante Kadić: Otkriće Amerike u hrvatskoj književnosti, Hrvatska revija br. 42/1992.
Ante Kadić: Ruđer J. Bošković : njegov književni i duhovni lik : prigodom 200-godišnjice njegove smrti, Hrvatska revija br. 37/1987.
Nevenka Nekić: Skica za portret Ruđera Boškovića, Hrvatska revija br. 49/1999.
Mirko Kratofil: Historiografija o Dubrovniku u 1999. godini., Hrvatska revija br. 50/2000.
Zbornik stihova i proze 18. stoljeća. "PSHK", knj. 19, prir. R. Bogišić, Zagreb 1973. (Mateša Antun Kuhačević; Vid Došen; Antun Ivanošić; Đuro Hidža; Marko Bruerović; Anica Bošković)
Sebastijan Slade, Fasti litterario-Ragusini, Dubrovačka književna kronika, Hrvatski institut za povijest, (Biblioteka Hrvatska povjesnica. Posebna izdanja), Zagreb, 2001

1714 births
1804 deaths
18th-century Croatian poets
18th-century Croatian women writers
Croatian women writers
People from Dubrovnik
Croatian women poets
Ragusan poets